Lapponia may refer to:
 Laponia (historical province), a historical Swedish province
 Lapponia (book), a 1673 ethnographic account of the region by Johannes Schefferus
 Lapponia (train), a Finnish express passenger train
 "Lapponia" (song), a song by Monica Aspelund, covered by Northern Kings
 Lapponia (liqueur), a Finnish brand of lakka

See also 
 Laponia (disambiguation)